The Château de la Pommerie is a château in the commune of Val de Louyre et Caudeau (formerly Cendrieux), Dordogne, Nouvelle-Aquitaine, France. It was listed as a monument historique in 2002. Since 1999 it has accommodated a museum about Napoleon I and his times.

References

Châteaux in Dordogne
Monuments historiques of Dordogne